NS10, NS 10, NS-10, NS.10, or, variation, may refer to:

Places
 Admiralty MRT station (station code: NS10), Woodlands, Singapore
 Yamashita Station (Hyōgo), station code NS10; Kawanishi, Hyōgo Prefecture, Japan
 Shiku Station (station code: NS10), Ina, Saitama, Japan
 Colchester-Musquodoboit Valley (constituency N.S. 10), Nova Scotia, Canada
 Brokopondo District (FIPS region code NS10), Suriname

Other uses
 Yamaha NS-10, loud speaker
 Blue Origin NS-10, a 2019 January 23 Blue Origin suborbital spaceflight mission for the New Shepard
 RAF N.S. 10, a British NS class airship
 LZTR1, a protein and gene also called "NS10"

See also

 NS (disambiguation)
 10 (disambiguation)